Marguerite Templey (1880–1944) was a French stage and film actress.

Selected filmography
 The Beautiful Adventure (1932)
 L'Épervier (1933)
 Night in May (1934)
 The Secret of Woronzeff (1935)
 The New Testament (1936)
 A Woman of No Importance (1937)
 Counsel for Romance (1938)
 Rasputin (1938)
 Quadrille (1938)

References

Bibliography
 Goble, Alan. The Complete Index to Literary Sources in Film. Walter de Gruyter, 1999.

External links

1880 births
1944 deaths
French film actresses
French stage actresses
Actors from Nantes